The National Dream, also known as The National Dream: Building the Impossible Railway, was a 1974 Canadian television docudrama miniseries based on Pierre Berton's 1970 book of the same name, plus Berton's 1971 follow-up book The Last Spike. The television adaptation was written by William Whitehead and Timothy Findley.  Berton is listed as a consultant on the credits.

Production
The series portrayed the concept and construction of the Canadian Pacific Railway during the late 19th century, with Berton himself as narrator. The National Dream combined dramatic reconstructions of the events (directed by Eric Till) with documentary content (directed by James Murray).  Production required two years and cost $2 million. Royal Trust, which was the executor of Cornelius Van Horne's estate, paid $400,000 to be a principal sponsor.

CBC Television premiered the eight-part hour-long series on 30 March 1974 and aired its final instalment on 28 April 1974. The series' rated audience of three million within Canada set a record for CBC in terms of dramatic programming. The series was also dubbed in French and broadcast on Radio-Canada, and was later seen in modified form on BBC in the United Kingdom.

Principal cast

 John Colicos as Cornelius Van Horne
 Gillie Fenwick as Alexander Mackenzie
 William Hutt as John A. Macdonald
 Joseph Shaw as George Stephen
 Gerard Parkes as Edward Blake
 Chris Wiggins as Donald Smith
 Ted Follows as Charles Tupper

List of episodes

 The Great Lone Land
 The Pacific Scandal
 The Horrid B.C. Business
 The Great Debate
 The Railway General
 The Sea of Mountains
 The Desperate Days
 The Last Spike

After initial release
The series was never intended for international sales to cover any significant portion of its production costs. Berton, however, was believed to have earned at least $250,000 from it, as well as from a re-release of the related books.

There has never been a home video release, but it is available to educational institutions in DVD on special order from the CBC.

References

External links

University Directory of CBC Television Series: The National Dream, accessed 5 June 2008
 

CBC Television original programming
1970s Canadian documentary television series
Pierre Berton
1974 Canadian television series debuts
1974 Canadian television series endings
Works about rail transport
1970s Canadian television miniseries
1970s Canadian drama television series
Television series set in the 1880s
Television series about the history of Canada
Canadian television docudramas
Canadian political drama television series